Heillecourt is a commune in the Meurthe-et-Moselle department in north-eastern France. The 18th-century French historian, diplomat and Encyclopédiste Jean-Baptiste Luton Durival (1725–1810) died in Heillecourt as well as his brother Nicolas Luton Durival (1713–1795).

Population

See also 
 Communes of the Meurthe-et-Moselle department

References

Communes of Meurthe-et-Moselle